Histone deacetylase 7 is an enzyme that in humans is encoded by the HDAC7 gene.

Function 

Histones play a critical role in transcriptional regulation, cell cycle progression, and developmental events. Histone acetylation/deacetylation alters chromosome structure and affects transcription factor access to DNA. The protein encoded by this gene has sequence homology to members of the histone deacetylase family. This gene is orthologous to mouse HDAC7 gene whose protein promotes repression mediated via transcriptional corepressor SMRT. Multiple alternatively spliced transcript variants encoding several isoforms have been found for this gene. HDAC7 has both structural and functional similarity to HDACs 4, 5, and 9, as these four HDACs make up the Class IIa of HDACs in higher eukaryotes. Class IIa HDACs are phosphorylated by calcium/calmodulin dependent-kindase (CaMK) and protein kinase D (PKD) in response to kinase-dependent signaling. HDAC7 possesses little intrinsic deacetylase activity and therefore requires association with the class I HDAC, HDAC3 in order to suppress gene expression. It has been demonstrated through crystal structures of the human HDAC7 that the catalytic domain of HDAC7 has an additional class IIa HDAC-specific zinc binding motif adjacent to the active site. This is most likely to allow for substrate recognition and protein-protein interactions that are necessary for class IIa HDAC enzymes.

Alternative functions 

Although HDAC7 has shown to have little intrinsic deacetylase activity, studies have shown that HDAC7 may have various alternative functions related to development, proliferation, and inflammation.

One study showed that HDAC7 suppresses proliferation and β-catenin activity in chondrocytes. This was shown by knocking out HDAC7 in mice, which then resulted in increased levels of the cell cycle regulator, cyclin D3; decreased levels of the tumor suppressor, p21; and increased levels of active beta-catenin. Since each of these contribute to regulating cell proliferation, deletion of HDAC7 increased chondrocyte proliferation. This study also showed that signaling via the insulin/Insulin-like growth factor 1 receptor led to increased levels of HDAC7 in the cytosol than the nucleus and increased levels of active β-catenin, indicating that HDAC7 associates with β-catenin. During chondrogenesis, HDAC7 is translocated to the cytosol to be degraded, indicating that generally HDAC7 represses β-catenin activity in chondrocytes.

Another study supported the conclusion that HDAC7 and β-catenin associate together by demonstrating that HDAC7 controls endothelial cell growth through modulation of β-catenin. This was shown in the opposite way from the previous study, in that HDAC7 was overexpressed rather than removed. They found that overexpression of HDAC7 prevented nuclear translocation of β-catenin which then coincided with downregulation of the cell cycle regulator, cyclin D1. Overall, this study demonstrated that HDAC7 once again interacts with β-catenin to keep endothelial cells in a low proliferation stage.

Not only does HDAC7 play a role in the proliferation of cell growth in chondrocytes and endothelial cells, but it has also been demonstrated that HDAC7 is a crucial player in cancer cell proliferation through a study that showed mechanistic insight into the contribution of HDAC7 to tumor progression. This study showed that knockdown of HDAC7 resulted in significant cell arrest between the G(1) and S phases of the cell cycle. Subsequently, HDAC7 knockdown suppressed c-Myc expression which in turn blocked cell cycle progression. Through chromatin immunoprecipitation assays, it was shown that HDAC7 directly binds with the c-Myc gene and therefore HDAC7 silencing decreased c-Myc mRNA levels.

Outside of proliferation, an additional study demonstrated that HDAC7 promotes inflammatory responses in macrophages. This was shown by overexpression of HDAC7 in inflammatory macrophages in mice. This overexpression promoted lipopolysaccharide (LPS)-inducible expression of HDAC-dependent genes via a HIF-1alpha-dependent mechanism. This demonstrated that HDAC7 may be a viable target for developing new anti-inflammatory drugs.

In this vein, TMP195 and JM63 are the most potent HDAC7 inhibitors. However, both compounds are not selective amongst class IIa HDACs, pointing to the need to develop HDAC7 selective inhibitors to further validate HDAC7 as an anti-inflammatory target.

Interactions 

HDAC7A has been shown to interact with:

 BCL6, 
 Endothelin receptor type A, 
 HDAC3, 
 HTATIP, 
 IKZF1, and
 Nuclear receptor co-repressor 1.

See also 
 Histone deacetylase

References

Further reading

External links 
 

EC 3.5.1